Filippo Zaccanti (born 12 September 1995) is an Italian cyclist, who last rode for UCI ProTeam .

Major results
Source:
2017
 4th GP Capodarco
2019
 1st  Overall Tour de Hokkaido
1st Stage 1
 1st  Overall Tour de Korea
 1st  Mountains classification Tour of Japan

References

External links

1995 births
Living people
Italian male cyclists
Cyclists from Bergamo